Élisa Beetz-Charpentier  (1859 – 1949) was a French sculptor, medallist and painter. She studied sculpture at the Brussels Academy.

Work

Beetz-Charpentier was principally active as an artist from 1905 to 1924. Between 1910 et 1924, she showed at the Paris salon as a member of the Société nationale des beaux-arts, which she joined in 1905.

In 1909 she won a First Prize for "a Plaquette commemorating the Centenary of the Paris Firm of Pleyel, in competition with several other medallists."

In 1918, she created Claude Debussy's funeral mask, which is now held in the  Cité de la Musique, Paris. Seven of her medallion works are held in the Museé d'Orsay, Paris.

According to the research of Polish heraldist Jerzy Michta published in 2017, the version of the coat of arms of Poland used since 1927, designed by artist Zygmunt Kamiński, was actually copied from a 1924 plaque by Elisa Beetz-Charpentier made in honor of Ignacy Paderewski.

Personal life

Her second husband was Alexandre Charpentier and the witnesses at their wedding in 1908 were Claude Debussy and Auguste Rodin. Charpentier died a year later, on March 4, 1909.

Sources

References

1859 births
1949 deaths
19th-century French women artists
20th-century French women artists
French medallists
French women sculptors
People from Schaerbeek